Slovan Bratislava is a Slovakian multi-sport club from Bratislava:

 HC Slovan Bratislava (ice hockey)
 ŠK Slovan Bratislava (football)
 Slovan Bratislava (women) (women's football)
 RC Slovan Bratislava (rugby union)